Norcholestane, also known by the molecular formula C26H46, may refer to:may refer to:

 19-Norcholestane
 21-Norcholestane
 24-Norcholestane
 27-Norcholestane